Craig Wilcox is a Republican Illinois State Senator for the 32nd District. The district includes all or parts of Antioch, Bull Valley, Crystal Lake, Fox Lake, Greenwood, Harvard, Johnsburg, Lake Villa, Lakemoor, Marengo, McHenry, Spring Grove, Volo, Wonder Lake, and Woodstock.

Early life 
Wilcox was born in El Paso, Texas and raised in Essex Junction, Vermont.

Military career 
Wilcox attended Rensselaer Polytechnic Institute on an Air Force scholarship and graduated with a degree in electrical engineering in 1989. He then entered active duty as a Communications Officer and was selected to command on three separate occasions.

During his career, he served as Commander of the 89th Airlift Support Group at Joint Base Andrews. There, he led his unit providing global command and control communications and aerial port services to the President of the United States and Air Force One. His first command was the 52nd Combat Communications Squadron, shortly after the September 11 attacks, where he helped establish new airbases in Kyrgyzstan. His second deployment was in March 2003 in southern Iraq, where his unit established the first United States Airbase in enemy territory in over 50 years. Colonel Wilcox returned to Iraq for his final deployment during the height of the insurgency and commanded for a year from 2006-2007 at Balad Air Base. Colonel Wilcox earned two Bronze Star Medals during these combat tours.

Illinois Senate
Wilcox moved to McHenry, Illinois following his retirement from the U.S. Air Force in 2013. In 2016, he was elected to the McHenry County Board to represent District 4. In 2017, incumbent Republican Senator Pamela Althoff announced her intention to run for McHenry County Board instead of seeking reelection to the Illinois Senate. Craig Wilcox and John Reinert, a fellow Republican member of the McHenry County Board, filed to run for the Republican nomination, but Reinert withdrew before the primary. Wilcox then faced Democratic nominee and McHenry Township Assessor Mary Mahady. During the general election, Wilcox was appointed to the Illinois Senate to succeed Althoff, who stepped down early. Wilcox defeated Mahady in the general election.

Committee assignments
 Local Government (Minority Spokesperson); Veterans Affairs (Minority Spokesperson); Energy and Public Utilities; Financial Institutions; Human Rights; Labor; State Government; Transportation; Appropriations; App- Agriculture, Envir. & Energy (Sub-Minority Spokesperson); App- Business Regulations and Labor (Sub-Minority Spokesperson); App-Government Infrastructure; App- Veterans Affairs (Sub-Minority Spokesperson); Redistricting- Chicago Northwest; Redistricting- Lake & McHenry.

References

External links
Senator Craig Wilcox (R) 42nd District at the Illinois General Assembly
100th,101st

Living people
Year of birth missing (living people)
21st-century American politicians
County board members in Illinois
Republican Party Illinois state senators
People from El Paso, Texas
People from Chittenden County, Vermont
People from McHenry, Illinois
Rensselaer Polytechnic Institute alumni
United States Air Force officers
Military personnel from Texas
Military personnel from Illinois